"Balance Ton Quoi" (stylized "Balance ton quoi") (see next paragraph for context) is a song written and recorded by Belgian singer-songwriter Angèle, for her debut studio album Brol (2018). Produced by Angèle alongside Tristan Salvati, the song was released on March 1, 2019, as the sixth single for Brol.

The title references the #MeToo movement as it plays on the phrase #BalanceTonPorc (meaning "Denounce your pig"), which was popular in France during the movement. Within the song, she candidly commentates on the sexism and misogyny that exists in contemporary society and supports the idea that education is the best way to combat it. 

"Balance Ton Quoi" peaked number 1 in Belgium (Wallonia), number 13 in Belgium (Flanders), number 2 in France and number 33 in Switzerland. This song also received a two-time platinum certification from the Belgian Entertainment Association (BEA) and a diamond certification from The Syndicat national de l'édition phonographique (SNEP), making it one of her most successful songs to date.

The music video of the song was directed by Belgian photographer and filmmaker, Charlotte Abramow and premiered on April 15, 2019.

Background and release
"Balance Ton Quoi" was released prior as part of Angéle's debut studio album Brol on October 5, 2018. It was then released as the sixth single of the album on March 1, 2019.

Music video
The music video for the song premiered on April 15, 2019. It was directed by Belgian photographer and filmmaker Charlotte Abramow. French actors Pierre Niney and Antoine Gouy make a cameo within the video as two students in the "anti-sexism academy".

Credits and personnel
Credits adapted from Tidal.

 Angèle vocals, producer, composer, lyricist,  keyboards, programming
 Tristan Salvati producer, bass (vocal), guitar, keyboards, programming
 Adrien Pallot mastering engineer, studio personnel
 Chab Mastering mastering engineer, studio personnel
 Hugo Martinez "Martimix" mixer, studio personnel

Charts

Weekly charts

Year-end charts

Certifications

References 

2019 singles
2018 songs
2019 songs
Ultratop 50 Singles (Wallonia) number-one singles
Angèle (singer) songs